() is a Polish word meaning 'leader' or 'chief' (from  'at the forefront'). It may refer to:

 the title used by Tadeusz Kościuszko as the leader of the Kościuszko Uprising, 1794
  (Chief of State), the title used by Józef Piłsudski as a provisional head of state, 1918–1922
 , the title used by Chief Scouts of the Polish Scouting and Guiding Association